Tailgation is shorthand for “Tailgate Nation.” Tailgations are communities of sports fans who congregate in the parking lots of football stadiums before games.  They erect tents and fire up barbecues, haul out portable beer pong tables and cornhole....all hours before a major sporting event.  Deep South Tailgations, typically seen at SEC football games feature high-end RV's, HD television screens and lots of fried chicken. Tailgations are defined by the activities and traditions held sacred by any tailgater: among them, BBQ, beer, games, and community. Tailgations grow organically, with traditions being passed down from one generation to the next.

Origin 
The term is attributed to sports blogger Jason Maloni, a business of sports expert with Levick Strategic Communications and contributor to the Washington Post sports blog The League.

References

External links 

Sports fandom